Juozas Rimas (born 1942) is a Lithuanian oboist and professor at the Lithuanian Academy of Music and Theatre who has recorded over 150 pieces and played for a number of regional orchestras.

Biography

Juozas Rimas graduated from the Lithuanian Academy of Music and Theatre in 1965, and completed his post-graduate studies at the Saint Petersburg Conservatory in 1969. He began performing as a soloist in 1961, and has been one of the most active Lithuanian soloists since then. Rimas' performances have frequently been featured on Lithuanian National Radio. He has participated in a number of international festivals, performing in the genres of classical music, jazz, and Lithuanian folk music, as well as premiering about 50 pieces written for the oboe by   Georgian, Uzbek, and Russian composers.

In 2004, Rimas was honored with Lithuania's Order of Vytautas the Great (Officer's Cross):lt:Vytauto Didžiojo ordino Karininko kryžius.

References
CV of honorable tutors. Retrieved September 7, 2007. 
About Juozas Rimas. Retrieved September 7, 2007.
Biography. Retrieved September 7, 2007. 
 Juozas Rimas: Lietuviška auletika. Bernardinai.lt, 2005-07-07. Accessed 2011-01-27.

External links
Downloadable MP3s of Juozas Rimas' performances. Retrieved September 7, 2007.

Living people
1942 births
Lithuanian classical oboists
Male oboists
Academic staff of the Lithuanian Academy of Music and Theatre
Musicians from Vilnius
20th-century Lithuanian musicians
21st-century Lithuanian musicians
20th-century male musicians
21st-century male musicians